is a passenger railway station located in the city of Higashimurayama, Tokyo, Japan, operated by the private railway operator Seibu Railway.

Lines
A limited number of through services to the Seibu Shinjuku line during the morning rush hour.

Station layout
The station has a single side platform serving a single bi-directional track, which is elevated above a major road.  The station has one entrance/exit to the north of the station.

History
The station opened on 1 October 1942.

Station numbering was introduced on all Seibu Railway lines during fiscal 2012, with Yasaka Station becoming "ST05".

Passenger statistics
In fiscal 2019, the station was the 78th busiest on the Seibu network with an average of 6,171 passengers daily. 

The passenger figures for previous years are as shown below.

Surrounding area
Yasaka station is located near to the headquarters and factories of the Bridgestone tire company. Nearby is a large supermarket, part of the Daiei chain.  Also in the neighborhood is Higashimurayama municipal park and Yasaka Jinja.

See also
List of railway stations in Japan

References

External links

Seibu Railway page for Yasaka Station

Railway stations in Tokyo
Railway stations in Japan opened in 1942
Stations of Seibu Railway
Seibu Tamako Line
Higashimurayama, Tokyo